The Ministry of Finance Development of the Republic of Somaliland is the Somaliland government ministry which is concerned with the economy of Somaliland. In particular, it concerns itself with taxation, financial legislation, financial institutions and capital markets. it's also responsible for planning and carrying out the government policy on public finance and budget and it applies and manages the regional and local financing systems and the provision of information on the economic-financial activity of the different public administrations. The current minister is Dr. Saad Ali Shire.

Ministers of Finance

See also

Diplomatic missions of Somaliland
Foreign relations of Somaliland

References

External links
 Ministry of Finance of the Republic of Somaliland

Politics of Somaliland
Government ministries of Somaliland
Somaliland